Thomas H. Flood (1804  – 1873) was a nineteenth-century American politician from Virginia.

Early life
Flood was born in Buckingham County, Virginia in 1806, before it split to form Appomattox County. He was educated at Washington College in Lexington, Virginia.

Career

As an adult, Flood established a plantation in what would become Appomattox County, and served in the General Assembly until 1845 when Appomattox County split from Buckingham County.

In 1850, Flood was elected to the Virginia Constitutional Convention of 1850. He was one of three delegates elected from the Southside delegate district made up of his home district of Appomattox County, as well as Charlotte and Prince Edward Counties.

Flood was elected to the Senate of Virginia from the district of Campbell County, Appomattox County and the city of Lynchburg for the 1852-1853 term.

During the American Civil War, Flood was again elected as a Delegate to the General Assembly from Appomattox County in 1861 to 1862 under the Confederate regime.

Death
Thomas H. Flood died in Appomattox County, Virginia in 1873.

References

Bibliography

Members of the Virginia House of Delegates
1804 births
1873 deaths
Virginia state senators
People from Appomattox County, Virginia
19th-century American politicians